James "Jim" Connelly (born October 7, 1932 in South Porcupine, Ontario) is a Canadian former ice hockey right winger who competed in the 1960 Winter Olympics, scoring five goals and eight points in seven games en route to winning a silver medal.

He played for the Waterloo Hurricanes and Guelph Biltmores. Connelly played 104 games in the Ontario Hockey Association. He played with 52 Guelph Biltmores who won the Memorial Cup. In 1960 he played on the Allan Cup winning Senior Canadian Championship.

References

External links

 sports-reference

1932 births
Canadian ice hockey right wingers
Sportspeople from Timmins
Ice hockey players at the 1960 Winter Olympics
Living people
Medalists at the 1960 Winter Olympics
Olympic ice hockey players of Canada
Olympic silver medalists for Canada
Olympic medalists in ice hockey
Ice hockey people from Ontario